The discography of David Cassidy, an American pop artist, consists of twelve studio albums, three live albums, six compilation albums, three soundtrack albums and twenty-four singles. David Cassidy started recording albums in 1970. His career is most notable for his solo music and his recordings with the Partridge Family.

Albums

Studio albums

Live albums

Musical soundtrack albums

Remix albums

Compilation albums

EPs

Singles

See also
 The Partridge Family discography

Notes

References

Discographies of American artists
The Partridge Family albums